This articles presents detailed results of the Japanese 2014 general election of the House of Representatives. It lists all elected Representatives in the 295 single-member districts and the 11 regional proportional representation (PR) blocks. Subsequent by-elections and the PR block replacement candidates to be elected later without additional vote in cases of death, resignation or disqualification (kuriage-tōsen) are not listed.

District results only for winner, runner-up and any other candidate above 20% of the vote, format: Candidate (Party – endorsing parties) vote share. Endorsements by parties that have not nominated any candidates themselves are not included. Party affiliations as of election day, subject to change at any time, composition may have already changed by the opening session of the first post-election Diet (see the List of members of the Diet of Japan).

Party names are abbreviated as follows:
 Ruling coalition
 L Jiyūminshutō, Liberal Democratic Party of Japan
 K Kōmeitō, Komeito
 Opposition parties
 D Minshutō, Democratic Party of Japan
 JIP Ishin no Tō, Japan Innovation Party
 PFG Jisedai no Tō, Party for Future Generations
 PLP Seikatsu no Tō, People's Life Party
 JCP Nihon Kyōsantō, Japanese Communist Party
 SDP Shakaiminshutō, Social Democratic Party
 NRP Shintō Kaikaku, New Renaissance Party
 Minor parties not represented in the Diet before the election who have nominated candidates in 2014
 HRP Kōfuku Jitsugentō, Happiness Realization Party
 Genzei Genzei Nippon, "Tax Cuts Japan"
 Shijinashi Shiji seitō nashi, "support no party"
 WECP Sekai keizai kyōdōtaitō, World Economic Community Party
 Republican Kyōwatō, "Republican Party"
 FP Miraitō, "Future Party"
 I Independents

Electoral districts affected by the 2013 redistricting are marked as follows:
 Aomori 2 §: Boundary changed
 Fukui 3: Eliminated

Hokkaidō

Tōhoku

Northern Kantō

Southern Kantō

Tokyo

Hokuriku-Shin'etsu

Tōkai

Kinki

Chūgoku

Shikoku

Kyūshū

References 

2014 election pages by major newspapers:
 Yomiuri
 Asahi
 Mainichi

General elections in Japan
2014 in Japan
Election results in Japan